Kolapo Olubunmi Olushola Eleka is a Nigerian politician and the former deputy governor of Ekiti State.

Early life and education
Kolapo Olushola started his schooling at St. Matthew's Primary School Ikere-Ekiti between the year 1972 to 1978. He then proceeded to Annunciation Secondary School where he had his Secondary education. He was a student of Obafemi Awolowo University (OAU) where he obtained both his Bsc & PhD. He obtained his Msc in Construction Technology from the University of Lagos in 1993.

Political career
He was a former deputy governor of Ekiti State.

References 

Living people
21st-century Nigerian politicians
University of Lagos alumni
Year of birth missing (living people)